The men's 200 metres event at the 1951 Pan American Games was held at the Estadio Monumental in Buenos Aires on 1 and 2 March.

Medalists

Results

Heats
Held on 1 March

Semifinals
Held on 2 March

Final
Held on 2 March

References

Athletics at the 1951 Pan American Games
1951